Washington Park was the name given to three Major League Baseball parks (or four, by some reckonings) on two different sites in the Park Slope neighborhood of Brooklyn, New York, located at Third Street and Fourth Avenue. The two sites were diagonally opposite each other at that intersection.

First park

The first Washington Park was bounded by Third and Fifth Streets, and Fourth and Fifth Avenues. The property contained an old building then called the Gowanus House, which stands today, albeit largely reconstructed. Known today as the Old Stone House, it was used as an impromptu headquarters by General George Washington during the Battle of Long Island, during a delaying action by 400 Maryland troops against approximately 2000 British and Hessian troops that allowed a good portion of the Continental Army to retreat to fortified positions on Brooklyn Heights. Those events inspired the ballpark's name.

The ballpark was the home of the Brooklyn baseball club during 1883–1891, with a slight interruption by a destructive fire in mid-May of the 1889 season. (Some sources, such as Retrosheet, number the pre- and post-fire ballparks as separate entities.) The team's uniforms and equipment had been stored in the Old Stone House at the time and were thus saved.

The team, at first called the Atlantics in reference to the old  Atlantics of Brooklyn, and then known as the Bridegrooms, had started in a minor league in 1883, joined the then-major American Association in 1884, and then switched to the National League in 1890. Streetcar (trolley) tracks ran near the ballpark, inspiring one of the team's many nicknames that ultimately stuck: Trolley Dodgers.

In 1891, the team moved into the Players' League one-year-old ballpark, Eastern Park in Brownsville. That move proved to be ill-advised, and Eastern Park was abandoned after six poorly attended seasons.

Second park

The second Washington Park was bounded by First and Third Streets, and Third and Fourth Avenues. The park seated 18,800. It consisted of a covered grandstand behind the infield and uncovered stand down the right field line. The Brooklyn National Leaguers, by then often called the "Superbas" as well as the "Dodgers", moved into this new ballpark in 1898, where they would play for the next 15 seasons. On April 30, 1898, the Dodgers played their first game at new Washington Park and 15,000 fans attended. One of the more unusual features of the Park was the aroma from nearby factories and Gowanus Canal, which was a block away and curled around two sides of the ballpark.

Meanwhile, owner Charlie Ebbets slowly invested in the individual lots on a larger piece of property in Flatbush, which would become the site of Ebbets Field once he had the entire block. So in 1913, the Dodgers abandoned Washington Park.

Third park

The Brooklyn Tip-Tops or "BrookFeds" of the Federal League, the only major league team ever named for a loaf of bread, acquired the ballpark property in 1914, then rebuilt the second Washington Park in steel and concrete. The old park took on a modern appearance; in fact, it was nearly a duplicate of the initial version of another Federal League park in Chicago that would become Wrigley Field. However, with the Dodgers in a new and somewhat more spacious steel-and-concrete home already, Ebbets Field, there was no long-term need for Washington Park, so it was abandoned for the final time after the Federal League ended its two-year run.

Part of the left center field wall of this final Washington Park still stands on the east side of 3rd Avenue, south of 1st Street, as part of a Con Edison yard.

Dimensions
(The Second Washington Park between 1st Street and 3rd Street)

Left field – 335 ft (1898), 375.95 ft (1908), 300 ft (1914)
Left center field – 500 ft (1898), 443.5 ft (1908)
Center field – 445 ft (1898), 424.7 ft (1908), 400 ft (1914)
Right center field – 300 ft (1898)
Right field – 215 ft (1898), 295 ft (1899), 301.84 ft (1908), 275 ft (1914)
Backstop – 90 ft (1898), 15 ft (1908)

Fences

Left field to center field – 12 ft.
Right field – 42 ft (13 ft. brick fence topped by 29 ft. of canvas)

References

 Green Cathedrals, by Phil Lowry. Society for American Baseball Research (June 1986).

External links
Brooklyn Ballparks page on Washington Park
First Washington Park, from Sanborn map, 1888
Second Washington Park, from Sanborn map, 1906

Defunct baseball venues in the United States
Defunct Major League Baseball venues
Sports venues in Brooklyn
Brooklyn Dodgers stadiums
Federal League venues
American football venues in New York City
Baseball venues in New York City
Former sports venues in New York City
Demolished sports venues in New York (state)